Mônica may refer to these footballers:

 Mônica (footballer, born 1978) (Mônica Angélica de Paula), Brazilian defender
 Mônica (footballer, born 1987) (Mônica Hickmann Alves), Brazilian defender